Hiawatha (Ioway: Hári Wáta pronounced ) is the largest city and county seat of Brown County, Kansas, United States.  As of the 2020 census, the population of the city was 3,280.

History

Etymology
B.L. Rider reportedly was responsible for naming Hiawatha, taking the young Indian's name from Henry Wadsworth Longfellow's poem, The Song of Hiawatha. In the poem is legendary Onondaga and Mohawk Indian leader Hiawatha. Adjacent to the former Ioway-Sac reservation and the present-day Ioway Tribe of Kansas and Nebraska, Hiawatha is called Hári Wáta in Ioway, meaning "I am looking far away".

19th century
Hiawatha was founded in 1857, making it one of the oldest towns in the state. John M. Coe, John P. Wheller, and Thomas J. Drummond were instrumental in organizing the city, and the site was staked out February 17, 1857. Hiawatha became the Brown County Seat in 1858, and the first school opened in 1870.

The main street was designated Oregon Street after the Oregon Trail. Parallel streets north of it were named after Indian tribes north of the Trail, and streets south carried tribal names of those south of the Trail.

20th century
The city is home to the longest running continuous Halloween parade in the nation, starting in 1914.

According to The New York Times in 2012, "the cartoonist Bob Montana inked the original likenesses of Archie and his pals and plopped them in an idyllic Midwestern community named Riverdale because Mr. [John] Goldwater, a New Yorker, had fond memories of time spent in Hiawatha"  Goldwater had hitchhiked to the community at the age of 17 and started working at the Hiawatha Daily World.

Geography
Hiawatha is located at  (39.852530, -95.536429).

Demographics

2010 census
As of the census of 2010, there were 3,172 people, 1,369 households, and 843 families residing in the city. The racial makeup of the city was 89.6% White, 2.3% African American, 2.9% Native American, 0.3% Asian, 1.2% from other races, and 3.8% from two or more races. Hispanic or Latino of any race were 3.9% of the population.

There were 1,369 households, of which 30.4% had children under the age of 18 living with them, 45.2% were married couples living together, 12.0% had a female householder with no husband present, 4.4% had a male householder with no wife present, and 38.4% were non-families. 34.3% of all households were made up of individuals, and 16.2% had someone living alone who was 65 years of age or older. The average household size was 2.27 and the average family size was 2.85.

The median age in the city was 42.6 years. 24.1% of residents were under the age of 18; 6.7% were between the ages of 18 and 24; 21.7% were from 25 to 44; 26.4% were from 45 to 64; and 21.1% were 65 years of age or older. The gender makeup of the city was 46.4% male and 53.6% female.

2000 census
As of the census of 2000, there were 3,417 people, 1,466 households, and 914 families residing in the city. The racial makeup of the city was 91.43% White, 2.78% African American, 2.19% Native American, 0.15% Asian, 1.20% from other races, and 2.25% from two or more races. Hispanic or Latino of any race were 2.99% of the population.

There were 1,466 households, out of which 28.4% had children under the age of 18 living with them, 50.2% were married couples living together, 9.8% had a female householder with no husband present, and 37.6% were non-families. 34.0% of all households were made up of individuals, and 19.0% had someone living alone who was 65 years of age or older. The average household size was 2.27 and the average family size was 2.91.

In the city, the population was spread out, with 24.4% under the age of 18, 7.7% from 18 to 24, 23.8% from 25 to 44, 21.9% from 45 to 64, and 22.1% who were 65 years of age or older. The median age was 41 years. For every 100 females, there were 87.4 males. For every 100 females age 18 and over, there were 82.6 males.

The median income for a household in the city was $35,854, and the median income for a family was $46,310. Males had a median income of $31,843 versus $20,385 for females. The per capita income for the city was $16,981. About 8.5% of families and 9.0% of the population were below the poverty line, including 11.3% of those under age 18 and 6.8% of those age 65 or over.

Tourist attractions 
 Davis Memorial

The Davis Memorial is a monument in the Mount Hope Cemetery, built by John Milburn Davis in honor of his wife Sarah after her death. Begun soon after her death in 1930 and completed in 1934, the monument consists of statues of the couple and a small shelter, carved from Italian marble. Its cost (approximately $200,000) led many in the community to criticize Davis for his free spending during the Great Depression. Today, the monument benefits the community financially because of the thousands of tourists who visit it. The memorial was added to the National Register of Historic Places in 1977.

 City clock
701 Oregon Street; downtown area

This is the only such clock between Indianapolis and Denver on U.S. Route 36. It was built in 1891 as part of the First National Bank building and is listed on the Kansas Register.

 Brown County Historical Museum
611 Utah Street, South of Brown County Courthouse Square

It is owned and operated by the Brown County Historical Society. This building is listed in the National Register of Historic Places.

 Brown County Ag Museum
301 E. Iowa Street, West of Davis Memorial

It resembles a 1900 farmstead with a paved windmill trail for sightseers and joggers to use and enjoy. There is a log cabin replica that is the office, wash house, barn, brooder house, corn crib, cabinet shop, horse drawn implement building, antique tractor building and many windmills and wind chargers.

Leisure 
Hiawatha City Lake is a tree-shaded 7-acre impoundment a mile south of the city, popular for picnicking and camping.
 Baseball and softball parks
 Bruning Park, in west Hiawatha, has 3 main fields: 2 for baseball, 1 for softball. Other fields are available, but are not managed. Bruning Park also has a concession stand and a small playground. The park is also home to soccer.
 Noble Park is a recent addition in Hiawatha that lies just south of the aquatic park. Deemed as one of the most premier Legion fields in the state, Hiawatha has been host to Zone and State Legion baseball tournaments. This is American Legion Post #66's home field. The park has a concession stand, batting cage, and playground. Every year the Leo Tritsch Memorial Tournament is held at Noble Park.
 The Hiawatha Middle School softball field is home to Hiawatha High School softball practices and some games. The field lies between the middle school and the Fisher Community Center.

Government 
The city is governed by a 5-member commission.
 Mayor: Bill Collins
 City Administrator: Interim Larry Paine

Education

Hiawatha High School 
Hiawatha High School (HHS) teaches grades 9-12, and is located at 600 Red Hawk Drive. Their mascot is the Red Hawks (changed from Redskins after 2000), and the school colors are red and blue.

The campus lies on the far east side of Hiawatha. The architecture is in circular form, with a domed circular gym nicknamed "The Roundhouse." The classrooms are connected in "pods."

"West Campus" is a separate set of buildings for agricultural and industrial arts classes. Memorial Stadium lies north of the school and a prairie trail area and practice field is east of the main school.

In athletics, HHS is class 3A, and has won two girls basketball state championships in 1978 and 1979, a state football championship in 1980, and a girls cross country state championship in 2017. The Red Hawks are a member of the Big 7 League, with a total of nine teams in northeast Kansas. Athletics include football, volleyball, boys' and girls' cross country, boys' and girls' basketball, power lifting, boys' and girls' track and field, boys' and girls' tennis, softball, baseball, boys' golf, and Scholar's Bowl.

Other activities and organizations include cheerleading, Color Guard, Dance Team, journalism, Yearbook, Gifted-Talented Program, National Honor Society, Red Hawk Club, Kansas Association for Youth, International Club, Student Council, Red Hawk Reader's Club, Biology Club (travels to the Bahamas annually), National FFA Organization, Business Professionals of America, Family Career and Community Leaders of America, and Fellowship of Christian Athletes. The school has a new greenhouse at West Campus and a weightroom.

Hiawatha Middle School 
 Grades 5-8
 Located at 307 S. Morrill Avenue
 Mascot: Redhawks (changed from Warriors after 2000)
 Colors: Red & Blue (changed from Burgundy & White after 2008)

HMS is a recently erected school in 2000 after moving from Robinson Middle School in Robinson, Kansas. The school lies on the east side of Hiawatha, just south of the high school. The school is divided into 4 sections, by grade level. HMS has an advanced Life Skills technology classroom and a modern gym. There is a Gifted-Talented program along with Title Math and Reading. There is a softball field to the south of the school and a practice field and track west of the school. The Hiawatha Hawks are a member of the Big 7 League, with a total of six teams in northeast Kansas. Athletics include cross country, football, volleyball, wrestling, boys' and girls' basketball, and track and field. Scholars' Bowl and gymnastics are also available.

Hiawatha Elementary School 
 Grades K-4
 Located at 600 Miami Street
 Mascot: Redhawks (Changed from Braves after 2000)

HES is in north central Hiawatha and has been for many years. The school starts kids out in Kindergarten and graduates them after 4th grade. The school is divided into halls for each grade level. HES has many school programs including Title Reading, Speech, Gifted-Talented, and Extended Learning. The playground is modern with new fitness equipment for children.

Mascot 
In December 2000, the Hiawatha USD 415 School District voted 4-3 to eliminate the American Indian mascots from the schools. The high school had the nickname 'Redskins', similar to 'Indians' when the school was in its early years. The middle school was the 'Warriors' and the elementary school, the 'Braves'.

The District received much praise for its transition, including the National Congress of American Indians and organizations as far away as Washington, D.C. After narrowing down many potential new nicknames, the high school decided to retain its red pride, renaming itself the 'Red Hawks'. The middle school obtained the name 'Hawks' and the elementary school, 'Junior Hawks'.

Media 
 KNZA 103.9 - FM station with a country music radio format including local news, weather and sports. 
 The Hiawatha World - weekly newspaper. 
 Penny Press - newspaper classifieds publication

Notable people 
 Bion Barnett - banker
 Al Buell - pinup artist
 William Gallagher - 1953 Pulitzer Prize-winning photographer
 John Goldwater - cofounder / editor / co-publisher of Archie Comics, news reporter when he lived in Hiawatha
 Bill Martin, Jr. - children's book author
 Homer McCrerey - commissioned US Naval Academy officer and bioengineering oceanographer
 John McLendon - inducted into Basketball Hall of Fame in 1979
 Dennis Pyle - Kansas House member 2001-2003, State Senate 2005-2022, Gubernatorial candidate 2022.
 Joe Wilhoit - baseball player, record holder for longest consecutive game hitting streak in professional baseball (69)
 Tod D. Wolters - retired United States Air Force four-star general, Supreme Allied Commander, Europe, veteran of Persian Gulf and Afghan wars.

References

Further reading

External links

 City of Hiawatha
 Hiawatha - Directory of Public Officials
 USD 415, local school district
 Hiawatha city map, KDOT

Cities in Kansas
County seats in Kansas
Cities in Brown County, Kansas
Populated places established in 1857
1857 establishments in Kansas Territory